The 2015 Campeón de Campeones was the 43rd edition of the Campeón de Campeones and the first since 2006. The match was contested on July 20, 2015 between the 2014–15 Liga MX season Apertura and Clausura champions Club América (Apertura 2014 champions) and Santos Laguna (Clausura 2015 champions). Unlike previous editions, the match was played at a neutral venue, Toyota Stadium in Frisco, Texas, United States.

The 2015 Campeón de Campeones was part of a doubleheader, which also included the 2015 Supercopa MX, organized by Univision Deportes, Soccer United Marketing (SUM), FC Dallas and Liga MX.

Match details

References

Cam
Campeón de Campeones
Club América matches
Santos Laguna matches
July 2015 sports events in Mexico